The Spitfire Grill (also known as Care of the Spitfire Grill) is a 1996 American film written and directed by Lee David Zlotoff and starring Alison Elliott, Ellen Burstyn, Marcia Gay Harden, Will Patton, Kieran Mulroney and Gailard Sartain. It tells a story of a woman who was just released from prison and goes to work in a small-town café known as The Spitfire Grill.  

The film won the Audience Award at the 1996 Sundance Film Festival, prompting several distributors to enter into a bidding war in response to the positive buzz, but when the movie was finally released, critics as a whole responded less favorably than they had at Sundance. The movie is the basis for the 2001 Off-Broadway musical of the same name by James Valcq and Fred Alley.

Plot
The story centers on a young woman named Percy Talbott, a recently released parole from the prison at Windham, Ohio who arrives in the small town of Gilead in Maine during the wintertime with hopes of starting a new life. She lands a job as a waitress at the Spitfire Grill, owned by Hannah, whose gruff exterior conceals a kind heart and little tolerance for the grill's regular customers who are suspicious of Percy's mysterious past. None is more suspicious than Nahum, Hannah's nephew, who constantly criticizes Percy and launches his own investigation into her past; although his wife, Shelby, has a kinder curiosity and reaches out to Percy becoming one of her few friends in town.

When Hannah is bedridden after a nasty fall, she places Percy in charge of the Grill despite Percy's relative lack of experience with cooking and kitchen skills. Seeing that Percy is in need of help, Shelby pitches in to work at the Grill and help Percy win the approval of Hannah, who learns she does need friends. Joe, an attractive young man in town, becomes smitten with Percy and spends some time getting to know her, even introducing her to his father, Aaron. Although Joe eventually proposes to marry Percy, she refuses because she feels unworthy to be a wife and mother. Joe later reveals that he has been approached by a scientist who thinks that the town's trees might have medicinal benefits, which would lead to greater economic prospects for Gilead. 

As the plot unfolds, Percy encounters a local hermit in the woods who drops by every night to pick up a sack full of canned goods from Hannah. Initially unsuccessful at reaching out to the hermit, Percy discovers his makeshift abode in the woods where he crafts several art pieces resembling birds and owls. Slowly but surely, Percy begins to gain the trust of the hermit. At the same time, she learns from Shelby about how Hannah's missing son, Eli, had enlisted to serve in the Vietnam War and was never seen again, causing James to die from heartbreak and Hannah to become hard-hearted. Eventually, with help from her former cellmates in prison, Percy puts forward the idea to hold a $100-per-entry essay contest to find a new owner for the grill. Hannah opens up to the idea and this leads to more and more mail coming in with more money for the grill, thus creating a positive change in the town in regard to their perception of Percy and her perception to the town in turn. This even allows Percy to open up more about her past to Shelby. 

Unfortunately, the plans are disrupted by Nahum's suspicions about Percy and the investigation reveals that she went to prison for manslaughter. This turns the town and even Hannah against Percy, leaving Shelby as the only person to vouch for Percy which she angrily does to Nahum's face. Wrongly assuming that Percy will steal from the Grill, Nahum sneaks into the Grill and empties the safe of all the money into the sack, which Percy unwittingly takes into the woods for the hermit. The next day, Hannah finds the safe gone and assumes that Percy stole the money and took off, forcing the local sheriff to gather a posse of state troopers and some of Gilead's citizens to search for Percy. Shelby correctly deduces that Percy took shelter in an abandoned church that they had explored earlier on and finds her inside. There, Percy reveals that she was in an abusive relationship with her stepfather, Mason, who impregnated her and then later assaulted her, leading to her unborn baby's death. After whisking her away from the hospital and to a hotel, Mason drunkenly insulted the memory of Percy's baby, provoking her to kill him with a razor blade and leading to her incarceration. 

The local sheriff arrives with his men and takes Percy into custody. When Shelby confronts Hannah over the accusations against Percy, they learn that Percy gave the sack with the money in it to the hermit. Hannah then reveals that the same hermit is Hannah's shell-shocked, Vietnam veteran son, Eli, who had returned home from the Vietnam War and isolated himself from society despite Hannah's best efforts to w in him back, including trying to sell the grill. Fearing that the posse will kill Eli, Hannah and Shelby rush to the sheriff's office and convince Percy to help them save Eli. Running through the woods with the posse on Eli's trail, Percy runs through the river to warn off Eli, although she is swept by the raging waters and killed, thus sacrificing her own life to save Hannah's son. Nahum finds Eli cradling Percy's body downriver and identifies him by his face. 

Percy's selfless act prompts the town's citizens to examine their own conduct towards her more deeply, especially at the funeral service for Percy where Nahum confesses to having caused her death unintentionally and finally admitting that he never truly knew her as he had assumed. Later in the summertime as Gilead is celebrating its town festival, a woman named Clare arrives with her son Charlie. Clare, having won the essay contest for the Spitfire Grill, is welcomed enthusiastically by the citizens of Gilead and Hannah shows her to her new home and business as a place for Clare and her son to start life anew.

Cast

Themes

Overall, the film deals with powerful themes of redemption, hatred, compassion, independence, the economic problems of small towns, the plight of Vietnam War veterans, and, to some extent, female empowerment. The film somewhat misleads the audience into thinking that it will be Percy who finds redemption, but it is other characters and relationships, and indeed the town itself, that are powerfully redeemed through Percy's actions.

Background

The idea for the film was conceived by Malcolm Roger Courts, long-time director and CEO of Sacred Heart League, Inc., a Catholic nonprofit fundraising and communications organization based in Walls, Mississippi. In the late 1970s, he wished to make a film—an alternative to the ministry of print that was a hallmark of Sacred Heart League, which published and distributed millions of pieces of literature.

With the approval and support of the league's board of directors, Courts began searching for a screenplay that could be produced under the direction of Sacred Heart League's film production subsidiary, Gregory Productions, Inc. Courts and his colleagues read more than 200 prospective screenplays and found most of them lacking in Judeo-Christian values and good story-telling. In the early 1990s, Courts was introduced to Warren Stitt, who eventually became the executive producer of "The Spitfire Grill." Stitt knew of the work of Lee David Zlotoff of MacGyver fame, and an introduction was made. Courts agreed to field screenplay treatments from Zlotoff, and in late 1994, the story of the film was written by Zlotoff.

With private financing from Sacred Heart League, the film was shot in Peacham, Vermont and Troy, Vermont in 35 days in April–May, 1995. After editing the film, it was submitted to the Sundance Film Festival in the feature film competition, and was accepted for screening at the 1996 festival in Park City, Utah. Before screening at Sundance, Courts engaged composer James Horner to compose the musical score for the film.

With the three female stars in attendance at Sundance, Courts and his team enjoyed the support of an enthusiastic crowd during the festival screenings. During one sold-out festival screening, a representative of Castle Rock Entertainment viewed the film and contacted her superiors in Los Angeles. A second print of the film was sent by courier to the Castle Rock headquarters for screening by its executives, who promptly offered $10 million for the film's rights, the largest sum paid outright for an independent feature film.

On the heels of being sold to Castle Rock Entertainment, the film won the Audience Award at Sundance. The film was distributed worldwide with only a modest return and lukewarm critical reaction.

Profits from the sale of the film were used to construct a kindergarten through eighth grade school for 450 children in Southaven, Mississippi, located 10 miles from the Sacred Heart League headquarters in Walls.

In 2001, a musical adaptation of the film with a brighter ending, written by Fred Alley and James Valcq premiered at George Street Playhouse in New Brunswick, New Jersey, directed by David Saint and then moved to Playwrights Horizons Theater in New York.

Reception
The film received mixed to negative reviews. Critics generally were impressed by the film's efforts, but felt that the script was too underdeveloped and too similar to other films. Roger Ebert wrote "Watching this plot unfold, I was remembering last week's Heavy, which also premiered at Sundance; its cafe was run by an older woman (Shelley Winters), and had a veteran waitress (Deborah Harry) and a young waitress (Liv Tyler), and had a regular customer whose name was Leo, not Joe, although he was played by Joe Grifasi. Also echoing in the caverns of my memory were several other movies about stalwart women running cafes and striding above the local gossip: The Ballad of the Sad Cafe, Fried Green Tomatoes, Staying Together and of course Bagdad Cafe." Ebert also reviewed the film with Gene Siskel, each giving a thumbs down. Robert Roten of the Laramie Movie Scope wrote "this light character study explodes into a full blown melodrama at the end using a bunch of tired old clichés, like misplaced money, your standard hermit in the woods and an almost laughably melodramatic drowning. Give us a break. With a more imaginative story, this could have been a great movie, but as it is, it's just a C+."

The Spitfire Grill currently holds a 38% rating on Rotten Tomatoes, based on 29 reviews.

Accolades
Audience Award Dramatic - 1996 Sundance Film Festival

Home video
It was released on DVD both in 1999 and again under the Warner Archive label in 2013. It is available for digital purchase on Amazon Prime.

References

External links
 

Sundance Film Festival award winners
Films about Catholicism
Films about Christianity
Films set in Maine
Films shot in Vermont
Castle Rock Entertainment films
Films scored by James Horner
Columbia Pictures films
1990s English-language films
Films set in restaurants
American independent films
1996 independent films